Paula Badosa Gibert was the defending champion, but lost in the final to Katy Dunne, 7–5, 6–3.

Seeds

Draw

Finals

Top half

Bottom half

References

Main Draw

Torneig Internacional Els Gorchs - Singles